Wilfredo José Boscán Fernández (born October 26, 1989) is a Venezuelan former professional baseball pitcher. He previously played in Major League Baseball (MLB) for the Pittsburgh Pirates.

Career

Texas Rangers
Boscán played in the Texas Rangers organization from the 2007 season to the 2012 season.

San Diego Padres
Boscán played in the San Diego Padres organization during the 2013 season. He became a free agent after the season.

Boston Red Sox
Boscán played in the Boston Red Sox organization during the 2014 season.  He became a free agent after the season.

Pittsburgh Pirates
He signed with the Pittsburgh Pirates before the 2015 season.

Boscán was called up to the majors for the first time on May 16, 2015. He was then called up a second time on July 12, 2015, and a third time on July 19, 2015. Each time, he was optioned to the AAA Indianapolis Indians before getting the opportunity to make his MLB debut. He was designated for assignment on August 7, 2015, after Deolis Guerra's waiver claim was voided due to injury.

Atlanta Braves
Boscán made his major league debut against the Atlanta Braves on May 19, 2016, after receiving his fourth call-up. He recorded his first career win and hit on May 23 against the Colorado Rockies.

Boscán was claimed off waivers by the Atlanta Braves on August 10, 2016. He was released on August 27, 2016. He elected free agency on November 6, 2017.

Tigres de Quintana Roo
On April 25, 2019, Boscán signed with the Tigres de Quintana Roo of the Mexican League. Boscán did not play in a game in 2020 due to the cancellation of the Mexican League season because of the COVID-19 pandemic. He was released on December 9, 2021.

Venezuelan Professional Baseball League
On October 12, 2011, Wilfredo made his debut with the Águilas del Zulia organization in the Venezuelan Professional Baseball League (by its Spanish acronym). Currently he becomes to Navegantes del Magallanes since 2018 from a change.

See also
 List of Major League Baseball players from Venezuela

References

External links

1989 births
Living people
Águilas del Zulia players
Bakersfield Blaze players
Dominican Summer League Rangers players
Venezuelan expatriate baseball players in the Dominican Republic
Frisco RoughRiders players
Gwinnett Braves players
Hickory Crawdads players
Indianapolis Indians players
Las Vegas 51s players
Major League Baseball pitchers
Major League Baseball players from Venezuela
Myrtle Beach Pelicans players
Navegantes del Magallanes players
Pawtucket Red Sox players
Pittsburgh Pirates players
Portland Sea Dogs players
San Antonio Missions players
Spokane Indians players
Tigres de Quintana Roo players
Tucson Padres players
Venezuelan expatriate baseball players in Mexico
Venezuelan expatriate baseball players in the United States
Sportspeople from Maracaibo